The execution of Robert Van Hook occurred on July 18, 2018, at the Southern Ohio Correctional Facility in Lucasville, Ohio. Van Hook was executed via lethal injection for the 1985 murder of 25-year-old David Self. His case achieved notoriety because of his failed gay panic defense. Ultimately, his conviction was upheld by the U.S. Supreme Court and Governor John Kasich of Ohio rejected his bids for clemency.

The execution garnered new attention and significance in December 2020, when Governor Mike DeWine announced that the state of Ohio would no longer execute death row inmates via lethal injection. Since the execution of Van Hook, there has been an unofficial moratorium on capital punishment in the state, as a result of the impossibility to acquire drugs needed to carry out lethal injection. DeWine indicated no executions would be carried out until the Ohio General Assembly approves a new method of execution. As a result, Van Hook remains the last person executed in Ohio by lethal injection. If no new alternative execution method is found, he will also remain the last person executed in the state of Ohio.

Murder of David Self
On February 18, 1985, 25-year-old Robert J. Van Hook went to a bar in downtown Cincinnati, which was popular among gay men. At the bar he met 25-year-old David Self. The two left the bar together and went to Self's apartment in Hyde Park. At the apartment, Van Hook attacked Self and strangled him until he was unconscious. He then stabbed Self repeatedly to death with a knife that he took from the kitchen. After the murder, Van Hook ransacked the apartment and stole some jewelry. He then fled the scene after mutilating Self's body. Van Hook fled to Fort Lauderdale, Florida, and evaded detection until April 1, 1985, when he was arrested by Oakland Park police.

Trial

Van Hook was indicted for the offenses of aggravated murder and aggravated robbery. He confessed the murder to police and admitted his motive had been to lure a gay man with the intention of robbing him. According to court records, Van Hook had been robbing gay men since the age of 15. At his trial, Van Hook pleaded not guilty by reason of insanity and chose to have his case heard by a three-judge panel instead of a jury. Van Hook was convicted of the crime and was sentenced to death on July 30, 1985.

Homosexual panic defense
Van Hook's case garnered national attention when his defense team claimed "homosexual panic" may have prompted the killing. However, his gay panic defense failed, with the courts noting Van Hook's history of robbing gay men prior to the murder of Self.

Execution
The execution of Van Hook took place on July 18, 2018, at the Southern Ohio Correctional Facility in Lucasville, Ohio. His last meal consisted of double cheeseburgers, fries, strawberry cheesecake with whipped cream, a vanilla milkshake, and grapefruit juice. In his final statement he apologized to the family of Self and recited an adapted Norse prayer which appeared in the movie The 13th Warrior. Van Hook was executed via lethal injection using a combination of three drugs; midazolam, rocuronium bromide and potassium chloride. He was pronounced dead at 10:44 a.m. EST.

Future of capital punishment in Ohio
Van Hook's execution continued to attract attention. Following his execution via lethal injection, controversy arose when looking at Ohio's execution protocol. In January 2019, a federal judge ruled that Ohio's execution protocol could cause inmates severe pain and needless suffering. Because of this, Governor Mike DeWine, who assumed office as the governor of Ohio (also in January 2019), ordered the Ohio prison system to look at alternative lethal injection drugs that could be used in any future execution. He also delayed all pending executions in Ohio. He later froze all executions in Ohio indefinitely as the state struggled to find any new lethal injection drugs.

The execution of Van Hook garnered new attention in December 2020, when DeWine announced that lethal injection would no longer be an option for any future execution in Ohio. DeWine was quoted as saying "Lethal injection appears to us to be impossible from a practical point of view today." DeWine ruled that lawmakers must choose a different method of execution for death row inmates before they can be put to death in the future. He also said that no executions would occur in Ohio in 2021, which had not executed any inmate since Van Hook in 2018. DeWine, who still supports capital punishment, is far more skeptical of the practice because of the long delays between crime and punishment. He also claimed to mainly support capital punishment because he believed it acted as a deterrent to crime, something he is now less sure of.

Because of the new ruling, Van Hook remains the last person executed in Ohio by lethal injection. DeWine also stated that he does not see much support in selecting a new method of execution as a priority, meaning Ohio is unlikely to execute any inmate for a while, or possibly even indefinitely. This could also mean Van Hook will remain the last person executed in the state of Ohio, if a new method of execution is not selected or approved.

See also
 Capital punishment in Ohio
 Capital punishment in the United States
 List of most recent executions by jurisdiction
 List of people executed in Ohio
 List of people executed in the United States in 2018

References

1960 births
2018 deaths
21st-century executions by Ohio
21st-century executions of American people
American people executed for murder
July 2018 events in the United States
People convicted of murder by Ohio
People executed by Ohio by lethal injection
People from Sharonville, Ohio
Violence against gay men in the United States